Parhedyle cryptophthalma is a species of sea slug, an acochlidian, a shell-less marine gastropod mollusk in the family Microhedylidae.

Distribution 
This species occurs in the Mediterranean Sea.

Ecology 
Parhedyle cryptophthalma is marine and is a mesopsammic species, in other words, these very small slugs live in the interstitial spaces of marine sands.

References

Microhedylidae
Gastropods described in 1974